Colin Fraser (born January 28, 1985) is a Canadian former professional ice hockey centre. He played in the National Hockey League for the Chicago Blackhawks, Edmonton Oilers, Los Angeles Kings and the St. Louis Blues. Fraser is a two-time Stanley Cup champion, having won the Cup with the Blackhawks in 2010, and the Kings in 2012. Fraser was apart of the Kings for the 2014 season, but failed to have his name engraved on the Stanley Cup that year. After retiring from professional hockey in 2015, Fraser returned to the Blackhawks to work in their scouting department.

Playing career

Minor/Junior
Fraser was born in Sicamous, but raised in Surrey, British Columbia. Growing up, he played minor hockey with the Pacific Vipers of Vancouver with future Chicago Blackhawks teammates Brent Seabrook, Andrew Ladd and Troy Brouwer. He went on to play major junior in the Western Hockey League (WHL) with the Red Deer Rebels for four years. He spent time as their team captain. Following a 52-point campaign in his second WHL season, Fraser was drafted in the third round, 69th overall, by the Philadelphia Flyers in the 2003 NHL Entry Draft. In the subsequent season after being drafted by the Flyers, Fraser was traded to the Chicago Blackhawks on February 19, 2004, while still in the WHL, along with Jim Vandermeer and a second round selection (Bryan Bickell) in 2004 in exchange for Alexei Zhamnov and a fourth round selection (R. J. Anderson) in 2004.

Professional

In the subsequent season after being drafted by the Flyers and while still in the WHL, Fraser was traded to the Chicago Blackhawks on February 19, 2004, along with Jim Vandermeer and a second-round draft pick (Bryan Bickell) in 2004 in exchange for Alexei Zhamnov and a 2004 fourth-round pick (R. J. Anderson). Turning professional in 2004–05, Fraser made his debut with the Blackhawks' American Hockey League (AHL) affiliate, the Norfolk Admirals, appearing in a handful of games following the completion of his fourth and final WHL season. He remained in Norfolk for several seasons and made his NHL debut with the Blackhawks in 2006–07, dressing for one game. In 2007–08, the Rockford IceHogs became Chicago's AHL affiliate, where Fraser scored an AHL career-high 41 points while also playing in five games for the Blackhawks.

During the 2009–10 season, Fraser won the Stanley Cup while playing with the Chicago Blackhawks; he played in three playoff games. On June 24, 2010, it was announced that he was traded to the Edmonton Oilers in exchange for a 2010 sixth-round draft choice (Mirko Hoefflin).

On June 26, 2011, Fraser was traded by the Oilers to the Los Angeles Kings, along with a seventh-round pick in 2012, for Ryan Smyth. Fraser scored the Kings' first goal in Game 1 of the 2012 Stanley Cup Finals against the New Jersey Devils, a 2–1 Kings overtime victory. He won his second Stanley Cup on June 11, 2012, with the Kings. He then signed a two-year, $1.65 million contract extension on June 23. On February 8, 2014, the Kings placed Fraser on waivers for the purpose of demoting him to the Manchester Monarchs of the AHL. On April 22, the Kings then recalled Fraser during the first round of the 2014 Stanley Cup playoffs against the San Jose Sharks; however, he did not appear in any playoff games and was not an official member of the Kings' Stanley Cup-winning team; his name was not engraved on the Cup.

On September 5, 2014, the St. Louis Blues announced that they had signed Fraser to a one-year, two-way contract. He did not win a place with the Blues during training camp and, after clearing waivers, was assigned to the Chicago Wolves, their AHL affiliate. On December 31, 2014, Fraser was recalled by St. Louis from the Wolves and subsequently played his first game for the Blues against the Anaheim Ducks on January 2, 2015.

On June 16, 2015, as an impending free agent, Fraser signed to continue his career in Europe in agreeing to a one-year contract with German club, the Thomas Sabo Ice Tigers of the Deutsche Eishockey Liga. In the midst of the 2015–16 season, Fraser had appeared in 17 games for the Ice Tigers, registering 5 assists, before opting to immediately retire from professional hockey due to personal reasons on November 18, 2015.

After retiring from professional ice hockey, Fraser became an amateur scout for his former team, the Chicago Blackhawks.

International play

During his junior career, Fraser competed for Canada at the 2005 World Junior Championships in Grand Forks. He recorded five points in six games, helping Canada to a gold medal win against Russia in the Final. The gold medal marked Canada's first championship of a five-year run.

Career statistics

Regular season and playoffs

International

Awards and honours

References

External links

 

1985 births
Living people
Canadian expatriate ice hockey players in Germany
Canadian ice hockey centres
Chicago Blackhawks scouts
Chicago Blackhawks players
Chicago Wolves players
Edmonton Oilers players
Ice hockey people from British Columbia
Los Angeles Kings players
Manchester Monarchs (AHL) players
Norfolk Admirals players
People from the Columbia-Shuswap Regional District
Philadelphia Flyers draft picks
Red Deer Rebels players
Rockford IceHogs (AHL) players
Sportspeople from Surrey, British Columbia
St. Louis Blues players
Stanley Cup champions
Thomas Sabo Ice Tigers players